Walter Richard Brookins (July 11, 1889 – April 29, 1953), was an American aviator. He was the first pilot trained by the Wright brothers for their exhibition team.

Biography
Brookins was born in July 1889 in Dayton, Ohio to Clara Belle Spitler (1873–1947) and Noah Holsapple Brookins (1858–1936). He had three siblings: Alpharetta Brookins (1891–1971) who married Walter P. Hoffman; Noah Orville Brookins (1893–1954); Earl Brookins (1898–1992). Walter married Mary Lamke.

Walter was taught at school by Katharine Wright, sister of the Wright brothers and that led to his interest in flying. His first solo flight was after just two and a half hours of demonstration. He became the Wrights' first instructor for the Wright Exhibition Team.

He came into prominence at an Indianapolis meet, on June 14, 1910, where he made a new world's record for altitude of 1,335 m (4,380 ft).

He later set world records for altitude, transcontinental flight and endurance.

On July 10, 1910 at Atlantic City in New Jersey, he flew to an altitude of 1,882 m (6,175 ft) in his Wright biplane, becoming the first person to fly at an altitude of one mile. He pioneered corkscrews and other stunt flying.

On 29 September 1910, Brookins piloted the first flight from Chicago, IL, to Springfield, IL. He flew in a Wright Model B. For this flight he was awarded $10,000.

On 29 October 1910, Brookins flew the new Wright Baby Grand, a clipped wing V-8 powered flyer to compete in the Gordon Bennett Trophy competition at Belmont, New York. In front of the grandstand during the official timing, the aircraft lost half its cylinders and crashed, tossing Brookins out and leaving him with bruised ribs.

On December 20, 1910, Brookins performed his "spiral dip" at Dominguez Field, Los Angeles. He climbed to 500 feet powered by the Wright four-cylinder engine, then spiraled down whirling in a circle about 10 feet in diameter. He did three variations of the feat "... making turns which seemed impossible." To further astonishment the crowd, he did a series of dives at the ground, pulling up then diving.

He died in 1953 in Los Angeles and his ashes were buried at the Valhalla Memorial Park Cemetery in North Hollywood, California.

References

Further reading
 in Dayton, Ohio

New York Times; February 18, 1912. Walter Brookins Will Test Device Similar to That Used on Automobiles. Palm Beach, Florida; February 17. Experimental work with the aeroplane will be undertaken for the first time in Florida this week, when Walter Brookins, the American aviator, tries out on his flying machine a self-starting device similar to that used on automobiles. Aviators the world over have long been anxious to see this improvement made on flying machines so as to be able to ...
New York Times; June 18, 1910. Brookins in Airship Soars 4,503 Feet; He Breaks World's Record for Altitude at Indianapolis in Flight of 1½ Hours. Indianapolis, Indiana; June 17, 1910. Walter Brookins, in a Wright biplane, broke the world's aeroplane record for altitude today, when he soared to a height of 4,503 feet, according to the measurement of the altimeter. His motor stopped as he was descending, and he made a cross-country glide of two miles, landing easily in a wheat field.
New York Times; September 30, 1910. Springfield, Illinois. Longest American Flight by Brookins; With Two Stops He Goes in Wright Biplane from Chicago to Springfield, 187 Miles. Loses Wheel, But Goes On. Declares It Was a Trying Experience. Believes Chicago to New York Race Is Practicable.
New York Times; December 11, 1911. Aviator Predicts 100-mile Airships; Walter Brookins Thinks We Shall Soon Have Aeroplanes Crossing the Seven Seas. Aeroplanes for next season, according to Walter Brookins, will be able to make from 90 to 100 miles an hour, where they now make from 50 to 60 miles. He predicts that they will be able to make long voyages over seas, to alight in the ocean, start again from the water, and "trim sail" afloat in the air.

External links 

1889 births
1953 deaths
Members of the Early Birds of Aviation
American aviators
Burials at Valhalla Memorial Park Cemetery
People from Dayton, Ohio
Wright Flying School alumni
Flight altitude record holders
American aviation record holders